Baden is a commune in the Morbihan département in  Brittany in northwestern France.

Geography

Some of the islands of the Gulf of Morbihan fall within the boundaries of the commune.

Population
Inhabitants of Baden are called Badennois.

Museum
The Passions and Wings museum is devoted to the story of Joseph Le Brix (aviator), who is from the area, it includes a collection of robots and old toys donated by John and Anne Farkas.

International Relations
The town is twinned with Weilheim in Germany.

See also
Communes of the Morbihan department

References

External links
Official site 

Passion and Wings Museum
Mayors of Morbihan Association 

Communes of Morbihan
Populated coastal places in Brittany